Mike Juhasz (born July 23, 1976 in Vancouver, British Columbia) is a former professional Canadian football wide receiver who played for the Calgary Stampeders of Canadian Football League.

Early years
Juhasz grew up in Calgary and was a placekicker at James Fowler High School.

College years
Juhasz attended the University of North Dakota and played for the Fighting Sioux football team, where he finished his career with 123 receptions for 1,572 yards (12.78 yards per reception avg.) and 16 touchdowns. As a senior, he set the school's single-season receptions record with 84 receptions for 945 yards (11.25 yards per rec avg.) and nine touchdowns.

Professional career
Juhasz was chosen by the Hamilton Tiger-Cats in the 2000 CFL Draft 14th overall and, after spending the first three games of the 2000 CFL season on the practice roster, he played in the remaining 15 regular season games and had three receptions for 47 yards and one touchdown, two special teams tackles, and one defensive tackle. He spent the entire 2001 CFL season on Hamilton's injured list and signed to the Edmonton Eskimos practice roster for the 2002 CFL season.

Juhasz signed with the Calgary Stampeders for the 2003 CFL season and had a career year in the 2004 CFL season, playing slotback and unofficial backup kicker, he made a catch in every regular-season game for 634 receiving yards.

References

1976 births
Living people
American football wide receivers
Calgary Stampeders players
Canadian football wide receivers
Canadian players of American football
North Dakota Fighting Hawks football players
Canadian football people from Vancouver
Players of Canadian football from British Columbia